List of presidents of the Odelsting, the one chamber of the Parliament of Norway from 1945 to 2009, when the chamber was discontinued.

Footnotes

Politics of Norway
Norway, Odelsting
Storting